Finding Stuff Out was a Canadian children's television series, which premiered on TVOntario's TVOKids programming block in 2012. Hosted by Harrison Houde for the first three seasons and Zoey Siewert from season 4 onwards, the program educates viewers on science topics. The series was created by Edward Kay and Jonathan Finkelstein.

It has since been syndicated to other children's programming channels, including Knowledge Network, Pop, Nat Geo Kids, and Ion Television/Qubo.

The series is a three-time Canadian Screen Award nominee for Children's or Youth Non-Fiction Program, at the 1st Canadian Screen Awards in 2013, the 2nd Canadian Screen Awards in 2014 and the 4th Canadian Screen Awards in 2016. It won the award in 2016. In 2013, the show was also a Canadian Screen Award nominee for Best Cross-Platform Children's Project for Digital Media for its online components.

References

External links
 

2012 Canadian television series debuts
2010s Canadian children's television series
TVO original programming
Canadian children's education television series